Magick Fire Music is an EP released in 2000, by the American heavy metal band Virgin Steele, promoting the upcoming full-length album The House of Atreus Act II.

This EP includes an outtake from "The House of Atreus" project: "Agamemnon's Last Hour".

Tracklisting

Personnel

Band members
David DeFeis: all vocals, keyboards, synth bass, producer
Edward Pursino: all guitars, bass
Frank Gilchriest: drums

References

Virgin Steele albums
2000 EPs
Noise Records EPs